The Trinity Health Arena is a 3,000-seat multi-purpose arena in Muskegon, Michigan, United States. It was built in 1960 in partnership with philanthropist and industrialist Louis Carlisle Walker at a cost of $2 million, and on October 27, 1960, was formally gifted to the City of Muskegon.  Mr. Walker provided $1 million and the City provided $1 million toward the cost.  It is currently home to the Muskegon Lumberjacks of the United States Hockey League, Muskegon Risers SC of Major Arena Soccer League 2, and the West Michigan Ironmen indoor football team. The Arena will change its name to Trinity Health Arena after a corporate decision to rename Mercy Health facilities Trinity Health.

The arena was built on a site of a former supermarket, and in addition to sports is also used for concerts, trade shows, conventions and other events.  The arena measures  from the arena floor to the ceiling.  The arena contains  of arena floor space, and can seat up to 4,000 for basketball, up to 4,500 for concerts, and 3,500 for ice shows and wrestling. The Arena has gone through several renovations, with the most recent occurring in 2018. The renovation included removing seats from the arena, which once had more than 6,000 seats. The most recent renovation includes the addition of Rad Dads restaurant on the building's east side. A new restaurant will be developed on the western side of the arena facing Western Avenue called Carlisle's. Carlisle's will offer high end stadium food in a sports-themed atmosphere.

A portion of a former Plumb's grocery store, built in 1936, was actually incorporated into the Arena; it was known as the LC Walker Arena annex, used for conventions, banquets, meetings and other special events. Now, the area is used by Peak Performance, an athletic training and rehabilitation center.

Louis Carlisle Walker

Louis Carlisle Walker (1875–1963) was a furniture maker, an 1896 graduate of the University of Michigan and founder of the Shaw-Walker company which revolutionized the office furniture industry. His success in business was matched by his generosity to the community, and the arena bore his name until 2019.

References

External links
Trinity Health Arena  
Shaw-Walker History
City of Muskegon website on L.C. Walker Arena

Indoor arenas in Michigan
Indoor ice hockey venues in the United States
Sports venues in Michigan
Convention centers in Michigan
Buildings and structures in Muskegon, Michigan
Sports venues completed in 1960
1960 establishments in Michigan
Continental Basketball Association venues
Indoor soccer venues in Michigan